Ogilvie Village Halt railway station served the village of Deri, Caerphilly, Wales on the Brecon and Merthyr Tydfil Junction Railway. The site of the halt does not appear on os maps but was likely in private ownership. Nothing remains of the halt.

References 

Middleton Press  Brecon to Newport
Pantywaun Mineral Railway, nr Fochriw/Merthyr, S. Wales - 05/08  Derelict Places - Urban Exploring Forum

External links 

Disused railway stations in Caerphilly County Borough
Former Great Western Railway stations
Railway stations in Great Britain opened in 1935
Railway stations in Great Britain closed in 1962
1935 establishments in Wales
1962 disestablishments in Wales